Burton Doo (born May 29, 1930 in Cambridge, Massachusetts) was chief operating officer at robotics company Barrett Technology from 2001 until his death on November 25, 2013. He mentored a line of protégés in the art of business.  He began his career in the GE operations management program after graduating from Boston University with a BA in management. In 1970, Doo co-founded Altron, an advanced contract manufacturer, where he served as executive vice president. In 1998 Altron merged with Sanmina, and Doo retained his position as executive vice president until his retirement in 2000.

Sources
 Barrett Technology Site

1930 births
2013 deaths
Businesspeople from Cambridge, Massachusetts
American technology executives
American chief operating officers
Boston University School of Management alumni
20th-century American businesspeople